Eatoniella fuscosubucula is a species of marine gastropod mollusc in the family Eatoniellidae. It was first described by Winston F. Ponder in 1965. It is endemic to the waters of New Zealand.

Description

Eatoniella fuscosubucula has a small conical shell, with a large D-shaped aperture in the shell. The shells are white, with an inner brown layer also visible. The species measures 1.4 millimetres by 0.95 millimetres.

The species is similar in appearance to Eatoniella dilatata, but distinguishable by its colour and larger size, ad to Eatoniella verecunda by its smaller size, thinner shell and brown inner layer.

Distribution

The species is endemic to New Zealand. The holotype was collected by E.C. Smith in January 1950 from Paterson Inlet, Stewart Island. The species is found in the waters of the lower South Island, Stewart Island and the Auckland Islands.

References

Eatoniellidae
Gastropods described in 1965
Gastropods of New Zealand
Endemic fauna of New Zealand
Endemic molluscs of New Zealand
Molluscs of the Pacific Ocean
Taxa named by Winston Ponder